South Carolina Highway 703 (SC 703) is a  state highway in the U.S. state of South Carolina. The highway connects Mount Pleasant and Isle of Palms, via Sullivan's Island.

Route description
SC 703 begins at a partial interchange with U.S. Route 17 (US 17; Johnnie Dodds Boulevard) in Mount Pleasant, within Charleston County. This interchange is on the eastern end of the Arthur Ravenel Jr. Bridge and just south of the Mount Pleasant Memorial Waterfront Park. There is no access from US 17 south to SC 703 or from SC 703 north to US 17 north. It travels to the southeast and has an intersection with Patriots Point Road and Magrath Darby Boulevard. The former leads to the Patriots Point Naval and Maritime Museum; while the latter is used to complete the above interchange. The highway crosses over Shem Creek and curves to the east-northeast. It passes Christ Our King-Stella Maris School at the eastern terminus of Interstate 526 Business (I-526 Bus.; Chuck Dawley Boulevard). SC 703 then curves to the south-southeast. It crosses over the Intracoastal Waterway on the Ben Sawyer Bridge and enters Sullivan's Island. The highway intersects Jasper Boulevard, onto which SC 703 turns left, at the Dr. George G. Durst Sr. Intersection. It begins traveling to the northeast and crosses over Breach Inlet on the H.L. Hunley Bridge and enters Isle of Palms. The highway continues to the northeast and intersects the southern terminus of SC 517 (Isle of Palms Connector), at the Rep. Mike Sottile Intersection, just north-northwest of Isle of Palms County Park. Just before 21st Avenue, the highway curves to travel closer to the coast. One block past 40th Avenue, it curves to the north-northwest for about one block. Here, Palm Boulevard turns to the right and travels to the east-northeast, while 41st Avenue continues to the north-northwest.

Major intersections

See also

References

External links

SC 703 at Virginia Highways' South Carolina Highways Annex
Former SC 703 ALT at Virginia Highways' South Carolina Highways Annex

703
Transportation in Charleston County, South Carolina
Mount Pleasant, South Carolina